Obrima rinconada is a species of moth in the family Erebidae. It is found in North America.

The MONA or Hodges number for Obrima rinconada is 8565.

Subspecies
These two subspecies belong to the species Obrima rinconada:
 Obrima rinconada pimaensis Barnes & Benjamin, 1925
 Obrima rinconada rinconada

References

Further reading

 
 
 

Eulepidotinae
Articles created by Qbugbot
Moths described in 1894